Peewit may refer to:
 Magpie-lark, a species of bird found in Australia and southern New Guinea
 Northern lapwing, a species of bird found in Eurasia and northern Africa
 Peewit, a fictional dwarf in the Belgian comics series Johan and Peewit